Sparrow Records is a Christian music record label and a division of Universal Music Group.

History 
Sparrow Records was founded in 1976 by Billy Ray Hearn, then artists and repertoire (A&R) director at Myrrh Records. Purchased by Thorn EMI in 1992, Sparrow's parent underwent a demerger four years later to become the EMI Group, and the label is now part of the Capitol Christian Music Group. Sparrow Records rose to prominence with the signing of singer, songwriter, Contemporary Christian musician and minister Keith Green. Within a year of his 1976 signing by Sparrow, Green was the top selling Christian artist in America.

As of 2009, Sparrow's artists include Britt Nicole, Chris Tomlin, Mandisa, Matt Redman, Matthew West, Steven Curtis Chapman and Switchfoot. Since 1996, a popular production of Sparrow Records has been the annual WOW Hits contemporary Christian music series. In 1998, the WOW franchise then added the annual WOW Gospel series of albums. The WOW Worship series was introduced in 1999, an annual compilation of the greatest hits in contemporary worship music.

Roster 

 Riley Clemmons
 Jimi Cravity
 Crowder
 Kristene DiMarco
 Colton Dixon (with 19 Recordings)
 Jon Foreman
 Amy Grant
 Hillsong United
 Hillsong Worship
 Hillsong Young & Free
 Mandisa
 Mosaic MSC
 Shawn McDonald
 NF (with Capitol Records)
 Britt Nicole (with Capitol Records)
 Christy Nockels
 Nichole Nordeman
 Passion
 Rend Collective (with Rend Family Records)
 Kristian Stanfill
 The Young Escape
 We the Kingdom
 Tauren Wells

Former 

 2nd Chapter of Acts (disbanded)
 Above the Golden State
 Susan Ashton (active, unsigned)
 Audrey Assad (active, independent)
 Avalon (active, with Red Street Records)
 Margaret Becker (active, with Kingsway Music)
 Bellarive
 Dan Bremnes
 Steve Camp (active, unsigned)
 Michael Card (active, unsigned)
 Marcos Vidal (active, unsigned)
 Carman (deceased)
 Steven Curtis Chapman (active, with Reunion Records)
 City Harbor
 Daryl Coley (deceased)
 David Crowder*Band (disbanded, had moved to sixstepsrecords)
 Danyew
 Delirious? (disbanded)
 Bethany Dillon (active)
 Dogs of Peace (active)
 Earthsuit (disbanded)
 The Elms (disbanded)
 Kirk Franklin (active, with GospoCentric Records)
 Peter Furler (active, independent)
 Keith Green (deceased)
 Steve Green (active, unsigned)
 Rickey Grundy, (active, independent)
 Charlie Hall (active, with sixstepsrecords)
 Matt Hammitt
 Tramaine Hawkins
 Tim Hughes (active, with Survivor Records)
 Kari Jobe (active, with Capitol Christian Music Group)
 Jump5 (disbanded)
 Phil Keaggy (active)
 Donald Lawrence
 Luminate
 Barry McGuire (active, unsigned)
 Geoff Moore and the Distance (disbanded)
 Michael W. Smith (active, with Rocketown Records)
 Needtobreathe (active, with Atlantic Records)
 Newsboys (active, with Fair Trade Services)
 Christy Nockels (active, with sixstepsrecords)
 Out of the Grey (on hiatus)
 Twila Paris (active, with Koch Records)
 Charlie Peacock (active, independent)
 Marty Raybon
 Matt Redman (active, with Integrity Music)
 Resurrection Band
 Sanctus Real (active, with Fair Trade Services)
 Sarah Reeves
 Samestate
 Robbie Seay Band (active, unsigned)
 Something Like Silas
 Soulfire Revolution
 Aaron Spiro (active, unsigned)
 Kristian Stanfill (active, with sixstepsrecords)
 Starfield (active, independent)
 Switchfoot (active, with lowercase people records) (Switchfoot still has a distribution agreement with Sparrow Records)
 Russ Taff (active, with Springhouse Records)
 John Michael Talbot (active, with Troubadour for the Lord)
 Steve Taylor
 Dave Thrush (active, independent)
 Chris Tomlin (active, with sixstepsrecords)
 Michelle Tumes (active, with EMI CMG)
 James Vincent
 The Waiting (active, independent)
 Sheila Walsh
 Matthew Ward (active, independent)
 Matthew West
 Lisa Whelchel
 White Heart
 Josh Wilson (active on Black River Christian)
 Deniece Williams (last worked, with Shanachie Records)
 ZOEgirl (disbanded)
 Danniebelle Hall (deceased)
 West Angeles Church of God in Christ Mass Choir and Congregation ("Saints in Praise" series)
 The Archers (musical group)

Compilations 
 Firewind: A Contemporary Dramatic Musical (1976)
 Christmas (1988)
 Passion: Awakening (2010)

See also 
 List of record labels
 Contemporary Christian Music

References

Sparrow projects 
 WOW Worship Series

External links 
 Official site
 EMI Christian Music Group

American record labels
Record labels established in 1976
Universal Music Group
Gospel music record labels
Evangelical Christian record labels
1976 establishments in Tennessee